Arnaldo José da Silva (1 February 1944 – 24 May 1999), known simply as Arnaldo, was a Portuguese footballer who played as an attacking midfielder.

External links

1944 births
1999 deaths
Bissau-Guinean emigrants to Portugal
Sportspeople from Bissau
Bissau-Guinean footballers
Portuguese footballers
Association football midfielders
Primeira Liga players
Liga Portugal 2 players
G.D. Fabril players
Leixões S.C. players
G.D. Riopele players
C.D. Montijo players
F.C. Barreirense players
Amora F.C. players
Seixal F.C. players
Portugal under-21 international footballers
Portugal international footballers